William Johnston Almon (27 January 1816 – 19 February 1901) was a Nova Scotian physician and Canadian parliamentarian. He was the son of William Bruce Almon.

Born in Halifax, Nova Scotia, Almon received his medical education from the University of Edinburgh and the University of Glasgow. He was awarded a medical degree from the later university in 1838.  By 1839, Almon had returned to Halifax and had an established a medical practice.  He is noted for being among the first physicians in North America to employ chloroform as a surgical anesthetic, a procedure he first performed on 5 February 1848, within 90 days of the first-ever application of chloroform as an anesthetic by James Young Simpson in Edinburgh.  Almon was also a pivotal figure in the establishment of the first hospital in Halifax, and helped found, and served three terms as president of, the Medical Society of Nova Scotia.

As an alumnus of King's College, Almon created the Welsford Testimonial (Almon-Welsford Testimonial) after the fallen Crimean War Hero (See the Welsford-Parker Monument), the President of the University presents it to the successful candidate every year.

Almon assisted in helping confederate sympathisers escape justice in the Chesapeake Affair during the American Civil War.

As a Liberal-Conservative first elected in the Canadian federal election of 1872, Almon served one term as a Member of Parliament representing the electoral district of Halifax in the province of  Nova Scotia. Although he did not stand again in 1874, he was on 15 April 1879 appointed to the Senate of Canada on the recommendation of Sir John A. Macdonald. He represented the senatorial division for Halifax until his death.

Electoral history

Gallery

Legacy 
 The Almon-Welsford Testimonial Prize, King's University

References 

 
 
 “Bluenose Effrontery”: Dr. William Johnston Almon and the City of Halifax During the United States’ Civil War. 2013.

1816 births
1901 deaths
19th-century Scottish medical doctors

Canadian surgeons
Canadian people of Scottish descent
Canadian senators from Nova Scotia
Conservative Party of Canada (1867–1942) MPs
Conservative Party of Canada (1867–1942) senators
Members of the House of Commons of Canada from Nova Scotia
People from Halifax, Nova Scotia
Colony of Nova Scotia people
Alumni of the University of Edinburgh
Alumni of the University of Glasgow